Andrea Dettling (born 19 January 1987) is a Swiss Alpine skier. She was fifth in Super-G at the 2009 Alpine Skiing World Cup. She represented Switzerland at the 2010 Winter Olympics.

References 

Swiss female alpine skiers
Olympic alpine skiers of Switzerland
Alpine skiers at the 2010 Winter Olympics
Living people
1987 births
21st-century Swiss women